Perigo is a surname. Notable people with the surname include:

 Lindsay Perigo (born 1951), New Zealand politician and television and radio broadcasting personality
 William Perigo (1911–1990), American basketball player and coach

See also
 Pedigo
 Perrigo